The Weitou dialect (Jyutping: Waitau Waa) is a dialect of Yue Chinese. It is spoken by older generations in Luohu and Futian districts in Shenzhen, and by those in the New Territories, Hong Kong.

The Weitou dialect can be heard in Hong Kong TV dramas and movies, and is usually used to depict characters who come from walled villages. For example, in the 1992 movie Now You See Love, Now You Don't, the chief character, played by Chow Yun-fat who himself grew up in Lamma Island, consistently speaks the Weitou dialect.

In a more general sense, Weitouhua can refer to any variety of Chinese spoken in the villages of Hong Kong, including Hakka and rural Yue dialects. In contrast, most Hong Kong residents speak standard Cantonese, while most Shenzhen residents speak Mandarin.

Phonology
Zhang & Zhuang (2003:21-4) records the phonological systems of three varieties of the Weitou dialect spoken in Hong Kong. Following is Fan Tin's, San Tin (in IPA).

There are four tone contours, when the "entering tones" (stopped syllables) are ignored: 
{| class="IPA wikitable" style="text-align:center; margin:1em auto 1em auto"
|+ The 4 tones
| tone name || contour || description 
|-
|-
| Yang Ping ||  (21) || low|-
| Shang ||  (35) || high rising|-
| Qu ||  (33) || mid|}

 References 

 Zhang Shaungqing 張雙慶 & Zhuang Chusheng 莊初昇 (2003). Xianggang xinjie fangyan'' (香港新界方言 "The Dialects of the New Territories, Hong Kong"). Hong Kong: Commercial Press. .

External links
 黄建全，《深圳平湖围头话音系分析》，2005。
 《深圳方言分布》，深圳新闻网。

Cantonese language
Languages of Hong Kong
New Territories